Stewarton railway station is a railway station in the town of Stewarton, East Ayrshire, Scotland. The station is managed by ScotRail and is on the Glasgow South Western Line.

History 
The station was opened on 27 March 1871 by the Glasgow, Barrhead and Kilmarnock Joint Railway. The station closed on 7 November 1966, however it reopened on 5 June 1967. In April 2007 a 'Ticket Issuing Machine' was installed in recognition of the relatively high passenger levels.

Operations to reinstate a second line between Lochridge Junction near Stewarton and Lugton started in 2008.  During the upgrade work (on 27 January 2009), a bridge crossing the A735 road south of the station collapsed as an oil train was passing over it, resulting in several tank wagons in the consist derailing and catching fire.  No-one was hurt in the accident; the line was closed between Barrhead and Kilmarnock for three weeks whilst the tankers were recovered and the damaged bridge rebuilt (the structure had already been scheduled for replacement as part of the re-doubling project prior to the accident).

When the work was completed in September 2009, the second platform was reinstated, the pedestrian underpass re-opened and full disabled access provided. An overspill car park opened on 31 January 2012, accessed from platform 2.

Stewarton opened for goods traffic on 23 March 1871 and closed on 5 October 1964. It handled general goods as well as livestock and horseboxes.

The station lay 19.02 miles south of the old terminus, Glasgow Saint Enoch.

The station has been adopted (2015) by the staff and clients of Hansel Village near Symington and they also maintain the displays of planted flowers on the platforms.

Services

2008/09 

From December 2009 
The Sunday service is hourly and now serves local stations beyond Barrhead northbound (except Crossmyloof).

A ticket machine is located on Platform 2.

From December 2012 all trains on a Sunday use Platform 1 only as does the 5.31am Glasgow bound weekday train.

2016 floods
In January 2016 a number of Virgin Trains were re-routed via Kilmarnock due to flood damage to a bridge on the Glasgow to Carlisle main line near Lockerbie. The full regular half-hourly service was suspended for a time and replaced with an hourly during off peak times.

Gallery

References 

Butt, R. V. J. (1995). The Directory of Railway Stations. Patrick Stephens Ltd, Sparkford.

External links 
 Video and commentary on two navies who died whilst building the Lainshaw Viaduct.

Railway stations in East Ayrshire
Former Glasgow, Barrhead and Kilmarnock Joint Railway stations
Railway stations in Great Britain opened in 1871
Railway stations in Great Britain closed in 1966
Railway stations in Great Britain opened in 1967
Reopened railway stations in Great Britain
Railway stations served by ScotRail
SPT railway stations
Beeching closures in Scotland
Stewarton